Găvănoasa is a commune in Cahul District, Moldova. It is composed of three villages: Găvănoasa, Nicolaevca and Vladimirovca.

References

Communes of Cahul District